Santa & Andres is a 2016 internationally co-produced drama film written and directed by Carlos Lechuga.

The film had its world premiere in the Contemporary World Cinema section at the 2016 Toronto International Film Festival. It was shown at the San Sebastián, Zurich, Chicago, Göteborg, Miami, Cartagena, and Guadalajara film festivals, among others. It was also initially selected to be screened at the 2016 Havana Film Festival, which, in 2014, had bestowed its "Unproduced Script Award" to the film's script, but was subsequently excluded at the instigation of the state-run Instituto Cubano del Arte e Industria Cinematográficos. After having initially been invited to screen in competition at the Havana Film Festival New York in April 2017, the film was relegated to a special screening – according to Variety due to pressure from the ICAIC – and then, out of protest, pulled altogether by Lechuga.

Plot
In 1983 Cuba, Andrés, a dissident gay novelist is placed under house arrest for his sexual and ideological orientation. Santa, a local peasant woman working on a state farm is assigned to keep a close watch on him for three consecutive days, keeping him from disrupting a political event and gaining the attention of foreign journalists. An unlikely friendship forms between the two as they both realize that they have a lot in common.

Cast
 Jorge Abreu
 Lola Amores
 Eduardo Martinez

References

External links
 

2016 films
2016 drama films
Colombian drama films
Cuban drama films
French drama films
Cuban LGBT-related films
2010s Spanish-language films
Colombian LGBT-related films
2016 LGBT-related films
LGBT-related drama films
2010s French films
2010s Colombian films